Ophiusa despecta is a moth of the family Erebidae. It is found in Africa, including Nigeria, Gabon and Príncipe.

References
  (1989). Lepidopterorum Catalogus (New Series) Fascicle 118, Noctuidae. CRC Press. , 

Ophiusa
Insects of West Africa
Fauna of Gabon
Moths of Africa
Moths described in 1894